Miss Celie's Blues, also known as "Sister", is a song from the Steven Spielberg movie The Color Purple (1985), with music by Quincy Jones and Rod Temperton and lyrics by the two of them with Lionel Richie, performed by Táta Vega. The song was nominated for an Academy Award for Best Music, Original Song in 1986.

Background

During the song, composed in a blues/ragtime style, the singer explains to her "sister" that she has her in her mind as a kindred spirit. She sings that after a long period of loneliness on the road, she has finally become "someone" and hopes that her sister is also.

In the film, the song is sung by Shug to Celie, and portrays the romantic and sexual relationship blossoming between the two women. Although Shug was portrayed by Margaret Avery, her voice was synchronised by Táta Vega, and the harmonica at the beginning of the song was played by Sonny Terry.

Reception

"Miss Celie's Blues" was immediately popular with audiences, and Alice Walker, the author of the original novel took an instant liking to it. It became a concert piece independently of the song, and an unofficial anthem of the African-American lesbian community.

The song was covered by Ute Lemper (1987), Elba Ramalho (1989), Renato Russo (1994), Emiliana Torrini (1995), Nikka Costa (1996), Vanessa Petruo (2005), Marjorie Estiano (2005) and Eden Atwood (2010). It has also been interpreted in a jazz style by such artists as Pat Thompson, Molly Johnson and Chaka Khan.

References

1985 songs
American songs
Blues songs
LGBT-related songs
Songs written by Lionel Richie
Songs written by Quincy Jones
Songs written by Rod Temperton
Songs written for films